Saint-Génis-des-Fontaines Abbey  is a Benedictine abbey in Saint-Génis-des-Fontaines, Pyrénées-Orientales, France. It was dedicated to Saint Genesius and Saint Michael, to whom the surviving church is still dedicated.

History
The monastery is recorded for the first time in 819, in a document mentioning its abbot, Sentimir. Plundered and destroyed, it was rebuilt by order of King Lothair of France in 981.

Later it came under the protection of the Counts of Roussillon and later of the Kings of Aragon. The abbey church was enlarged and re-consecrated in 1153. In the 13th century it gained a marble cloister on the north-eastern side. Subsequently the abbey declined, and in 1507 was united with Montserrat Abbey.

During the French Revolution, the monks were expelled and the complex divided between several owners. The church was reopened to worship in 1846, as the village's parish church dedicated to Saint Michael. The cloister, which had been dismantled and sold, was bought back and re-installed in its original location in the 1980s.

Architecture

The abbey church was most likely built at the same time as the original monastery, in the 8th century. Of the original church there remain some of the foundation structures, which show its plan to have included a main apse and two deep side apses, with a long transept.

The 1153 enlargement, with the addition of the vaulted ceiling over the transept and nave, led to the reconstruction of the walls in order to support the additional weight of the roof vaults. The ceilings of the apses were also modified and decorated with frescoes, of which only a few traces remain today. The church kept the Latin Cross plan typical of Romanesque architecture, with a nave, transept and three apses. In the 17th century the church was enriched with Baroque altars.

The exterior has two bell towers from different ages. The larger one is located next to the transept and nave. The façade has several Romanesque sculptures and tombstones of monks and local notables. The main portal has an architrave with bas-reliefs commissioned by abbot Guillaume and realized in 1019-1020 in white marble from Céret. In the middle is portrayed Christ in majesty in a mandorla, supported by two archangels and flanked by two groups of three figures under the arcades, over which to either side of the mandorla is the inscription ANNO VIDESIMO QUARTO RENNATE ROTBERTO REGE WILIELMUS GRATIA ABA ISTA OPERA FIERI IUSSIT IN ONORE SANCTI GENESII CENOBII QUE VOCANT FONTANES, that is to say, "In the twenty-fourth year of the reign of King Robert, William, by the grace [of God] abbot, ordered this work to be made in honour of Saint Genesius the hermit, which is called Fontanes." The 24th year of the reign of King Robert II of France was 1019-20. A similar sculpture, perhaps by the same artist, is also present in the Abbey of St. Andrew, 4 km from Saint-Génis-des-Fontaines Abbey.

The cloister was built in the 13th century, and was already completed in 1271. It has been supposed that a cloister existed here before, which would be the one depicted near the figures in the portal architrave, but no traces of it remain. The capitals supporting the 13th century cloister are in late Romanesque style. It has been suggested that they could originally have been painted.

Sources

See also
 French Romanesque architecture

External links

Images of the abbey 

9th-century churches in France
12th-century Roman Catholic church buildings in France
Benedictine monasteries in France
Monuments historiques of Pyrénées-Orientales
8th-century establishments in Francia
Tourist attractions in Pyrénées-Orientales
Churches in Pyrénées-Orientales
Christian monasteries established in the 8th century